The 1985 World Junior Curling Championships were held from March 10 to 16 in Perth, Scotland for men's teams only.

Teams

Round robin

  Teams to playoffs

Playoffs

Final standings

Awards
 WJCC Sportsmanship Award:  Roger Schnee

All-Star Team:
Skip:  Bob Ursel
Third:  Brent Mendella
Second:  Peter Smith
Lead:  Peter Thomson

References

External links

J
1985 in Scottish sport
World Junior Curling Championships
Sport in Perth, Scotland
International curling competitions hosted by Scotland
March 1985 sports events in the United Kingdom
1985 in youth sport